Free-range eggs are eggs produced from birds that may be permitted outdoors. The term "free-range" may be used differently depending on the country and the relevant laws, and is not regulated in many areas.

Eggs from hens that are only indoors might also be labelled cage-free, barn, barn-roaming or aviary, following the animal happiness certification policies, also known as "happy chickens" or "happy eggs". This is different from birds that are reared in systems labelled as battery cages or furnished cages.

Legal definition
Legal standards defining free range can be different or even non-existent depending on the country. Various watchdog organizations, governmental agencies and industry groups adhere to differing criteria of what constitutes "free-range" and "cage-free" status.

United States
The United States Department of Agriculture (USDA) requires that egg producers be able to demonstrate that "free range" egg layers have access to the outdoors, though there is no government oversight as to the quality of the external environment, or the amount of time the hen has access to it. Many producers label their eggs as cage-free in addition to, or instead of, free-range. Recently, US egg labels have expanded to include the term "barn-roaming," to more accurately describe the source of those eggs that are laid by hens which can not range freely, but are confined to a barn instead of a more restrictive cage.

Debate

Cage-free eggs have been a major cause of debate in the US. In 2015 there was an initiative proposed in Massachusetts that would ban the sale of in-state meat or eggs "from caged animals raised anywhere in the nation". This shift from caged to cage-free is concerning for egg industry groups because they believe that this will cause the price of eggs to increase to the point that consumers can not afford to buy them, thereby causing a decline in the egg industry overall. Animal welfare advocates argue that costs will not change as drastically as industry groups are expecting and that the price of eggs will remain almost the same because the housing of the birds does not make a huge difference to cost. Egg industry groups are making an effort to show or "educate lawmakers, voters and consumers about the merits and cost-effectiveness of cage use". Local farmers and producers say that the shift will occur if that is what consumers want, they will adapt to having birds in or out of cages. Not only are there debates between the egg industry and animal welfare advocates, but people are also debating whether this issue is one that has to be handled by the federal government or the industry.

European Union
In the European Union, cage-free egg production includes barns, free-range, organic (in the UK, systems must be free-range if they are to be labelled as organic) and aviary systems. Non-cage systems may be single or multi-tier (up to four levels), with or without outdoor access.  In the UK, free-range systems are the most popular of the non-cage alternatives, accounting for around 44% of all eggs in 2013, whereas barns and organic eggs together accounted for 5%.

In free-range systems, hens are housed to a similar standard as the barn or aviary.

The European Union Council Directive 1999/74/EC stipulates that from 1 January 2007 (1 January 2012 for newly built or rebuilt systems), non-cage systems must provide the following:

 A maximum stocking density of nine hens/m2 of “usable” space (units in production on or before 3 August 1999 could continue with a stocking density up to 12 hens/m2 until 31 December 2011)
 If more than one level is used, a height of at least 45 cm between the levels
 One nest for every seven hens (or 1 m2 of nest space for every 120 hens if group nests are used)
 Litter (e.g. wood shavings) covering at least one-third of the floor surface, providing at least 250 cm2 of littered area per hen
 15 cm of perching space per hen.

In addition to these requirements, free-range systems must also provide the following:
 One hectare of outdoor range for every 2,500 hens (equivalent to 4 m2 per hen; at least 2.5 m2 per hen must be available at any one time if rotation of the outdoor range is practiced)
 Continuous access during the day to this open-air range, which must be “mainly covered with vegetation”
 Several popholes extending along the entire length of the building, providing at least 2 m of opening for every 1,000 hens.

Case studies of free-range systems for laying hens across the EU, carried out by Compassion in World Farming, demonstrate how breed choice and preventive management practices can enable farmers to successfully use non beak-trimmed birds.

Australia
In 2012, Australian Eggs, the body for the industry, tried to register a free-range trademark allowing 20,000 hens per hectare on the range.  This sparked a major discussion between large producers, small producers, animal welfare groups, and consumer rights groups. The trademark application was withdrawn after the Australian Competition & Consumer Commission commented that the "proposed standards may mislead consumers about the nature of eggs described as ‘free range’" in its Initial Assessment of the application.

There is a voluntary code, which covers the basic standards of husbandry for physiological and behavioural needs of poultry, that allows for 1,500 layer hens per hectare. However, the code also states that "any higher bird density is acceptable only when regular rotation of birds onto fresh range areas occurs". The voluntary code is under review and due to be consulted upon.

The Queensland government approved an increase in free-range layer hen stocking densities in July 2013. The maximum number of hens per hectare was increased from 1,500 to 10,000.

In March 2016, Australian ministers voted in new national standards for the definition of free-range. The new standards allow for up to 10,000 birds per hectare, with no requirement for the hens to actually go outside. Choice, Australia's largest non-profit consumer organisation believes Australia's consumer affairs ministers made the decision to put the interests of large-scale Australian egg producers ahead of the needs of consumers.

In April 2017, the Australian Government finalised the law and decided to mandate a maximum of 10,000 hens per hectare in outdoor grazing areas, to which the hens must have "regular and meaningful" access. Currently, the most popular free range accreditation schemes mandating roaming space at or below the standard set by the EU for its members, are the Free Range Farmers Association (750 hens per hectare), Humane Choice (1,500 hens per hectare) and Australian Certified Organic (2,500 hens per hectare under pasture rotation). In July 2017, Snowdale was fined a record amount of $1.05m (including legal costs) for falsely advertising that its eggs were 'free range'. This was substantially larger than the fines imposed upon Derodi, Holland Farms, Pirovic or Darling Downs Fresh Eggs; set at either $300,000 or $250,000.

Cost
Based on data in the European Commission's socio-economic report published in 2004, (prior to battery cages being banned in the EU) it cost €0.66 to produce 12 battery eggs, €0.82 to produce 12 barn eggs and €0.98 to produce 12 free-range eggs. This means that in 2004, one free-range egg cost 2.6 cents more to produce than a battery egg, and a barn egg cost 1.3 cents more to produce than a battery egg. The Commission's report concludes that, if costs were to increase by 20%, which it says is the type of percentage increase in terms of variable costs that producers are likely to face as a result of switching to free-range, the industry will potentially suffer a loss of producer surplus of €354 million (EU-25). The margins achieved by producers for barn and free-range eggs are appreciably higher than those that were available for battery eggs. The Commission's socio-economic report shows that margins for free-range eggs were around twice as high as those for battery eggs.

Animal welfare 
Many animal welfare advocates, including the Humane Society of the United States maintain that cage-free and free-range eggs constitute a considerable improvement for laying hens. This has led to the adoption of a cage-free eggs standard by most major food companies in the United States, although in 2017, it was estimated cage-free eggs represented only 10% of all produced. Pundits and food commentators have described the 2016 shift toward cage-free eggs across the food industry as a "bold decision" and historic shift. Several investigations, particularly by the animal rights group Direct Action Everywhere, have raised doubts about to what degree cage-free farms are an improvement for laying hens. An investigation of a cage-free Costco facility in late 2016 purported to find cannibalism from the birds attacking each other, and concluded that neither caged nor cage-free facilities offered laying hens positive lives.

Misconceptions

Free-range eggs may be broader and have more of an orange colour to their yolks owing to the abundance of greens and insects in the birds' diet.  However an orange yolk is no guarantee that an egg was produced by a free-range hen. Feed additives such as marigold petal meal, dried algae and alfalfa meal can be used to colour the yolks.

Contrary to popular belief, in the United States free-range regulations do not necessarily require that hens spend substantial time outdoors, only that the hens "have access to the outdoors". This access may be for very brief periods and the outside area may be small and sparse. Stocking densities indoors are often high, and many hens may stay inside as dominant hens often prevent the others from having access to the outside yard.

Nutritional content
Differences in age, strain and nutrition of the hens make scientific conclusions about the effects of housing systems on the quality of the eggs exceedingly difficult. Consumer perceptions of these alternative systems delivering a better product are then scientifically unjustified in terms of there being any nutritional difference. A 2011 research study carried out in North Carolina compared free-range and conventional caged eggs for fatty acids, cholesterol, vitamins A and E, finding higher fat content in free-range eggs, and no significant difference in cholesterol and vitamin levels. Vitamin D in eggs has been observed to increase up to 4 times in hens that have exposure to sunlight, compared to hens that are kept away from sunlight. Another research suggests that grass fed hens can produce eggs that are rich in (n−3) fatty acids, without adverse oxidative effects. Some other non peer-reviewed studies have found evidence for nutritional benefit of free-range eggs.

Retailers
Several major retailers have a policy of selling only free-range eggs, or, not selling battery-cage eggs. Some retailers apply this policy not just to eggs in their shells, but also to eggs used in baked goods and processed products such as ready-made meals, quiches and ice cream.  range shell eggs, and uses only free-range eggs in their processed products and ready-made meals.

As of 1 January 2007 (with one minor exception), all Austrian supermarkets no longer sell battery eggs. Many retailers in the Netherlands, including Albert Heijn and Schuitema (subsidiaries of Ahold), Laurus (including Edah, Konmar and Super de Boer), Dirk van den Broek (including Bas van der Heijden and Digros), Aldi and Lidl sell only free-range shell eggs; however the free-range eggs that are sold in Aldi and Lidl do not meet some country's recommendations for the production of free-range eggs. Three Belgian supermarkets: Makro, Colruyt and Lidl, no longer sell battery eggs.  The Commission's report states that Sweden's move away from conventional battery cages has been aided by the decision by the four largest retailers (who between them account for 98-99% of the Swedish retail market) to stop stocking conventional battery eggs. U.S. food suppliers Aramark and Unilever have announced they intend to buy only cage-free eggs, but as of 2013 there are not enough available to supply them.

In Australia free-range eggs that are sold in Aldi and Lidl do not meet the CSIRO's Model Code recommendation of 1,500 hens per hectare. In March 2016, Australian ministers voted in new standards for the definition of free-range. The new standards allow for up to 10,000 birds per hectare, with no requirement for the hens to actually go outside. Choice, Australia's largest non-profit consumer organisation  believes Australia's consumer affairs ministers made the decision to put the interests of large-scale Australian egg producers ahead of the needs of consumers. A group called PROOF (standing for Pasture Raised On Open Fields) is now in the process of developing an accreditation scheme which will see the term "pastured" start appearing on cartons. The guidelines for PROOF's pastured eggs allow for a maximum stocking density of 1500 birds per hectare (in line with the CSIRO Model Code) as well as requiring that hens are able to range freely in open fields or paddocks. So far, PROOF has 12 licensed egg farms in Australia, with another eight in the pipeline.

Environmental Impact 
Free range eggs carry an environmental cost.  This is mainly because in Free Range egg production systems, the habitat is difficult to control and the resource required to produce eggs is higher than in caged egg production.  A study done in the University of Newcastle, UK, showed a 16% increase in greenhouse gas emissions from a Free Range facility compared to a battery cage facility.

Rehoming charities

In the UK, charities such as Fresh Start for Hens and British Hen Welfare Trust organise rehoming for ex-factory hens that would otherwise be slaughtered.  Private smallholders pay around £4-5 per "rescue hen", and these birds (which may still be laying daily) then spend a "retirement" in a true free-range environment. The BHW Trust says that there is no better education than watching an ex-battery hen's confusion and bewilderment turn into wonderment at her new environment.

See also
Organic egg production
 Free range
 Yarding
 Pastured poultry
 Factory farming
 Chickens as pets
 The Happy Egg Company

References

Animal welfare
Poultry farming
Eggs (food)